Giorgi Leonidze (27 December 1899 – 9 August 1966) was a Georgian poet, prose writer, and literary scholar.

Biography 
Leonidze was born in the village of Patardzeuli in the eastern Georgian province of Kakheti. He graduated from the Tbilisi Theological Seminary in 1918 and continued his studies at the Tbilisi State University. His first poems appeared in Georgian press in 1911, and then, briefly collaborated with the Symbolist group Blue Horns. His real talent emerged in 1925 with a series of nature lyrics, responding with Romantic animation to the landscapes of Leonidze’s native Kakheti. Throughout the Soviet period, he tried to pursue the "correct" political line; his poetry became more historical and patriotic, the eventful history of Georgia providing him with the colorful medieval imagery which Leonidze translated into impulsive rhythms and metaphors. He quickly established himself as one of the most popular poets of Georgia, but, when the purges of the 1930s took lives of many of his fellow writers and his own brother, microbiologist Leon Leonidze, he was forced to direct his talents into panegyrics to Joseph Stalin. This was an unfinished 1936 epic dedicated to Stalin’s childhood and youth, remarkable for its simulated verve and a total of absence of biographic details, factual or invented.

He also wrote scrupulous literary studies of earlier Georgian poets such as Besiki and Baratashvili, and produced evocative prose based on his childhood memoirs and experiences – The Tree of Desire (ნატვრის ხე), which was filmed, in 1976, by Tengiz Abuladze as the second part of his famous trilogy. In his later years, Leonidze directed his wealth to the benefit of his native village and presided over the Institute of Georgian Literature at the Georgian Academy of Sciences from 1958 until his death in 1966. He is buried at the Mtatsminda Pantheon at Tbilisi.

References 

George L. Kavtaradze, Giorgi Leonidze (Biography) . Accessed on November 19, 2007.
George L. Kavtaradze, Giorgi Leonidze and his Poetry . Accessed on October 6, 2010.

1899 births
1966 deaths
Male poets from Georgia (country)
Writers from Georgia (country)
Philologists from Georgia (country)
Burials in Georgia (country)
20th-century poets from Georgia (country)
Members of the Georgian National Academy of Sciences
20th-century male writers
Place of death missing
20th-century philologists